Guinotia is a genus of crabs in the family Pseudothelphusidae, containing the following species:
 Guinotia dentata (Latreille, 1825)
 Guinotia pestai Pretzmann, 1965
 Guinotia rodriguezi Pretzmann, 1968

References

Pseudothelphusidae